Christopher S. Adams, Jr. (born July 8, 1930) is an American author and retired United States Air Force officer.

Early life and education
Adams graduated from Tomball High School, Tarleton State University, Texas A&M University-Commerce and the Industrial College of the Armed Forces.

Air Force career
During his US Air Force career, he served as a wing commander, air division commander and senior staff officer with the Defense Nuclear Agency and the Joint Chiefs of Staff.   He is a Command Pilot and Vietnam veteran, and logged over 8,000 hours in a variety of aircraft including the B-36, B-52, C-141 and C-47 ‘Gooney Bird’ in Vietnam.

During his military career he received the Distinguished Service Medal, the Department of Defense Meritorious Service Medal, two Legions of Merit, two Air Medals for service in Vietnam combat and numerous other awards; as well as the Daughters of the American Revolution Medal of Honor.

Civilian career
Adams retired from the Air Force with the grade of major general and chief of staff, Strategic Air Command in 1983 to accept an appointment as associate director at Los Alamos National Laboratory.  He later joined Andrew Corporation as vice president of government systems, where he spent fifteen years and traveled extensively in Saudi Arabia, China and the Soviet Union, including 23 extended visits to Russia, Ukraine and Belarus.

Public service and writing
Adams served with numerous government agencies and university foundations, and was appointed by Texas Governor Rick Perry to serve on the Brazos River Authority Board of Directors. He is the author of ten books on the Cold War, three non-fiction and seven spy novels.

Bibliography

References

Living people
1930 births
United States Air Force generals
United States Air Force personnel of the Vietnam War
Recipients of the Legion of Merit
Tarleton State University alumni
Texas A&M University–Commerce alumni